Jack Fergeus (5 June 1918 – 16 September 2005) was an  Australian rules footballer who played with South Melbourne in the Victorian Football League (VFL).

Notes

External links 

1918 births
2005 deaths
Australian rules footballers from Victoria (Australia)
Sydney Swans players